Spinnin' Deep is a Dutch record label founded in 2009 and specializing in house, deep house, tech house, future house and other EDM genres. It is one of the 40 sub-labels of Spinnin' Records. The label gained success rapidly in 2014, catching up with the parent label Spinnin' Records. The label includes the artists Bolier, Vector, CamelPhat, Chocolate Puma, EDX, Ferreck Dawn, Gregor Salto, Lucas & Steve, Martin Solveig, Mike Mago, Oliver Heldens, Pep & Rash, Sam Feldt, Sander Kleinenberg and Watermät. The label's first release was a compilation called Spinnin' Deep Presents: Tech-House Essentials.

The most successful international single from the label was "Intoxicated" by Martin Solveig and GTA, which reached 11th place in Germany, 81 in Australia, 26 in Ireland, 9 on the Top 40 chart in the Netherlands and 11 in the Single Top 100, and No. 5 in the United Kingdom.

Artists

Current

Past

References

External links
 
 

Dutch record labels
House music record labels
Electronic dance music record labels
Record labels established in 2009